The Niagara campaign occurred in 1814 and was the final campaign launched by the United States to invade Canada during the War of 1812. The campaign was launched to counter the British offensive in the Niagara region which had been initiated with the capture of Fort Niagara in December, 1813. As part of that campaign, and in response to the American burning of the village of Newark on the Canadian side of the river, British forces and their native allies burned the American villages of Buffalo and Black Rock.   
 

Having rejected the option of attacking the British naval base at Kingston in Upper Canada (as it was considered too logistically difficult and well defended), the American objective in the 1814 campaign was to deal the British a decisive blow on the Niagara peninsula. The American forces, commanded by General Jacob Brown and General Winfield Scott, began their counter campaign with the Capture of Fort Erie on the Niagara Peninsula early in July.  
Next, they defeated the British at the Battle of Chippawa.

At the Battle of Lundy's Lane three weeks later, both sides claimed victory, but because U.S. forces had suffered so many casualties, they pulled back to Fort Erie. Following their return to the fort, the British, under Gordon Drummond, attempted to capture the fort and the Siege of Fort Erie followed. The Americans were able to hold out, and the British eventually lifted the siege after suffering severe losses.  After a small engagement at Cook's Mills, American forces, commanded by General George Izard, abandoned Fort Erie and returned to the U.S. territory for winter quarters.  In February 1815 the U.S. Senate approved the Treaty of Ghent ending the war.

References

External links
The Glengarry Light Infantry Fencibles

Campaigns of the War of 1812